M. Kunjukrishnan Nadar (3 April 1911 – 15 August 1978) was an Indian politician. He represented Parassala constituency in the first and second Kerala Legislative Assemblies and Kovalam Constituency in the fourth legislative assembly. Kunjikrishnan Nadar also served as the President of Kanjiramkulam Grama Panchayat and was the chairman of Kerala Craft Development Board.

References

Kerala MLAs 1957–1959
Kerala MLAs 1960–1964
Kerala MLAs 1970–1977